Philippe Keyaerts is a Belgian designer of German-style board games. His two first published games are Vinci and Evo. Those two games use the mechanism of allowing the players to spend victory points to improve the characteristics of their play.  He also invented Space Blast, a small space battle game.  Philippe Keyaerts is best known as the designer of Small World, a 2009 fantasy-themed board game based upon a remake of Vinci.

Keyaerts is also active in the organisation of board game conventions in Belgium.

External links 
 
 Game Designer Interview: Philippe Keyaerts by Derek Thompson, 06/2011

Board game designers
Living people
Year of birth missing (living people)